Abu Ali Yahya ibn Isa ibn Jazla al-Baghdadi or Ibn Jazlah, Latinized as Buhahylyha Bingezla, was an 11th-century Arab physician of Baghdad and author of an influential treatise on regimen that was translated into Latin in 1280 AD by the Sicilian Jewish physician Faraj ben Salem.

Biography
Ibn Jazla was born of Christian Nestorian parents at Baghdad. He converted to Islam in 1074. He died in 1100 under the tutelage of Abu `Ali ibn Al-Walid Al-Maghribi.

Works

His Taqwim al-Abdan fi Tadbir al-Insan (Dispositio corporum de constitutione hominis, Tacuin agritudinum), as the name implies: tables in which diseases are arranged like the stars in astronomical tables, was translated into Latin.

There is a story which says that he was one of the physicians to Charlemagne and that he wrote Tables or Tacuin at the instigation of the latter. This story has no historical foundation unless Ibn Jazla was born two centuries earlier, for indeed, Charlemagne was emperor up to 814. The Tacuin was translated by the Jew Faraj ben Salim and the Latin version was published in 1532. A German translation was published at Strasbourg in 1533 by Hans Schotte.

Ibn Jazla also wrote another work, Al-Minhaj fi Al-Adwiah Al-Murakkabah, (Methodology of Compound Drugs), which was translated by Jambolinus and was known in Latin translation as the Cibis et medicines simplicibus.

A convert to Islam, he wrote works in praise of Islam and criticising Christianity and Judaism.

 Tacvini Aegritvdinvm et Morborum ferme omnium Corporis humani : cum curis eorundem / Bvhahylyha Byngezla Autore. [Trans.: Farag Ben Salim]. - Argentorati : Schottus, 1532. digital
 Tacuini sanitatis Elluchasem Elimithar : de sex rebus non naturalibus earum naturis operationibus ... recens exarati / Elluchasem Elimithar. - Argentorati : Schott, 1531. digital

References
Donald Campbell (1926), Arabian Medicine and its Influence on the Middle Ages, Vol. 1. London: Trübner.  Reissued by Routledge, 1974, 2000. .  p. 82.

External links
Tacuini aegritudinum et Morborum ferme omnium corporis humani, cum curis eorundem. Online scanned version of the 1532 Latin printed translation.

Physicians from the Abbasid Caliphate
Writers from Baghdad
Iraqi Muslims
Converts to Islam
1100 deaths
Year of birth unknown
11th-century physicians
11th-century people from the Abbasid Caliphate
11th-century Arabs